Nazir Ahmed, also transliterated Nazir Ahmad or Nazeer Ahmed, may refer to:

Chaudhry Nazeer Ahmad (born 1958), Pakistani businessman and politician
Khwaja Nazir Ahmad (1897–1970), Pakistani Ahmadiyya writer
Nazir Ahmad Dehlvi (1836–1912), Urdu writer and social and religious reformer
Nazir Ahmed (physicist) (1898–1973), Pakistani physicist, first chairman of PAEC
Nazir Ahmed Khan (1910–1983), Pakistani film actor, director and producer
 Nazir Ahmad Khan (Indian politician)
 Nazir Ahmad Khan (Pakistani politician)
Nazir Ahmed (scholar) (1915–2008), Indian scholar of Persian language and Padma Shri award winner
Nazir Ahmed (filmmaker) (1925–1990), Bengali filmmaker
Rank Nazeer Ahmed (born 1939), Indian Muslim scholar, Qur'an translator, and scientist
Nazeer Ahmed Baghio (born 1955), Pakistani politician
Nazir Ahmed, Baron Ahmed (born 1957), British former politician and peer
Nazir Ahmad Laway (born 1963), Indian politician
Nazir Ahmed Abbasi, Pakistani politician
Nazir Ahmad (neurosurgeon) (born 1950), neurosurgeon from Pakistan
Nazir Ahmad (cricketer), Afghan cricketer
Nazir Ahmad Qasmi (born 1 June 1965), Kashmiri Sunni scholar and Grand Mufti of the Darul Uloom Raheemiyyah seminary
Pir Nazeer Ahmed (1880–1960), Indian Sufi scholar
Rana Nazeer Ahmed Khan (born 1949), Pakistani lawyer and politician